Lower Frederick Township is a township in Montgomery County, Pennsylvania, United States. The population was 4,840 at the 2010 census.

History
The Knurr Log House in the township was listed on the National Register of Historic Places in 1974.

Geography
According to the United States Census Bureau, the township has a total area of 8.1 square miles (21.1 km2), of which 8.0 square miles (20.7 km2)  is land and 0.1 square mile (0.3 km2)  (1.60%) is water. It is drained by the Perkiomen Creek into the Schuylkill River. Its villages include Delphi, Obelisk (also in Upper Frederick Township,) and Zieglerville.

Neighboring municipalities
Upper Salford Township (east)
Schwenksville (south)
Perkiomen Township (south)
Limerick Township (southwest)
Upper Frederick Township (northwest)

Demographics

As of the 2010 census, the township was 94.3% White, 2.0% Black or African American, 0.3% Native American, 1.4% Asian, and 1.0% were two or more races. 3.0% of the population were of Hispanic or Latino ancestry.

As of the census of 2000, there were 4,795 people, 1,730 households, and 1,316 families residing in the township.  The population density was 599.6 people per square mile (231.4/km2).  There were 1,806 housing units at an average density of 225.8/sq mi (87.2/km2).  The racial makeup of the township was 95.52% White, 1.86% African American, 0.23% Native American, 0.81% Asian, 0.48% from other races, and 1.11% from two or more races. Hispanic or Latino of any race were 1.48% of the population.

There were 1,730 households, out of which 41.2% had children under the age of 18 living with them, 65.8% were married couples living together, 7.5% had a female householder with no husband present, and 23.9% were non-families. 18.6% of all households were made up of individuals, and 3.8% had someone living alone who was 65 years of age or older.  The average household size was 2.77 and the average family size was 3.19.

In the township the population was spread out, with 29.4% under the age of 18, 5.8% from 18 to 24, 37.7% from 25 to 44, 19.7% from 45 to 64, and 7.4% who were 65 years of age or older.  The median age was 35 years. For every 100 females there were 96.5 males.  For every 100 females age 18 and over, there were 96.1 males.

The median income for a household in the township was $60,125, and the median income for a family was $71,516. Males had a median income of $44,915 versus $34,135 for females. The per capita income for the township was $25,113.  About 1.7% of families and 2.7% of the population were below the poverty line, including 3.1% of those under age 18 and 2.4% of those age 65 or over.

Politics

Transportation

Pennsylvania Route 29 and Pennsylvania Route 73 are the primary highways traversing the township. They enter from the southeast concurrently along Gravel Pike, then diverge, with PA 29 following Gravel Pike northward and PA 73 following Big Road westward.

Education
Lower Frederick Township is part of the Perkiomen Valley School District.

Residents are zoned to Schwenksville Elementary School, Middle School West, and Perkiomen Valley High School.

References

External links

 Lower Frederick Township

Townships in Montgomery County, Pennsylvania